An incomplete bibliography of Gibraltar:

 

 
 
 
 
 
 
 
 
 
 
 
 
 
 
 
 
 
 
 
 
 

Gibraltar
Gibraltar-related lists